The Hanham Baronetcy, of Wimborne in the County of Dorset, is a title in the Baronetage of England. It was created on 24 May 1667 for William Hanham, a member of a Somerset family.

Hanham baronets, of Wimborne (1667)
Sir William Hanham, 1st Baronet ( – )
Sir John Hanham, 2nd Baronet (died 1703)
Sir William Hanham, 3rd Baronet (died  1762)
Sir William Hanham, 4th Baronet (1718–1776)
Sir William Thomas Hanham, 5th Baronet (1763–1791)
Sir James Hanham, 6th Baronet (c. 1726–1806)
Sir James Hanham, 7th Baronet (1760–1849)
Sir William Hanham, 8th Baronet (1798–1877)
Sir John Alexander Hanham, 9th Baronet (1854–1911)
Sir John Ludlow Hanham, 10th Baronet (1898–1955)
Sir Henry Phelips Hanham, 11th Baronet (1901–1973)
Sir Michael William Hanham, 12th Baronet (1922–2009)
Sir William John Edward Hanham, 13th Baronet (born 1957)

Notes

References
Kidd, Charles, Williamson, David (editors). Debrett's Peerage and Baronetage (1990 edition). New York: St Martin's Press, 1990, 

Hanham
1667 establishments in England